The National Institute of Aeronautics and Space (LAPAN) was the Indonesian government's space agency.  It was established on November 27, 1963, by former Indonesian president Sukarno, after one year's existence of a previous, informal space agency organization. LAPAN is responsible for long-term civilian and military aerospace research.

For over two decades, LAPAN managed satellites, including the domain-developed small scientific-technology satellite Lapan-TUBsat and the Palapa series of telecommunication satellites, which were built by Hughes (now Boeing Satellite Systems) and launched from the US on Delta rockets, or from French Guiana using Ariane 4 and Ariane 5 rockets. LAPAN has also developed sounding rockets and has been trying to develop small orbital space launchers. The LAPAN A1, in 2007, and LAPAN A2, in 2015, satellites were launched by India.

With the enactment of Presidential Decree No. 33/2021 on 5 May 2021, BATAN is due to be disbanded along with government research agencies such as the Agency of Assessment and Application of Technology (Indonesian: Badan Pengkajian dan Penerapan Teknologi, BPPT), National Nuclear Energy Agency (Indonesian: Badan Tenaga Nuklir Nasional, BATAN), and Indonesian Institute of Sciences (Indonesian: Lembaga Ilmu Pengetahuan Indonesia, LIPI). All of those agencies fused into newly formed National Research and Innovation Agency (Indonesian: Badan Riset dan Inovasi Nasional, BRIN). As of September 2021, the disbandment process is still on process and expected to be finished on 1 January 2022.

On 1 September 2021, LAPAN was finally dissolved as an independent agency and transformed into Space and Aeronautics Research Organization of BRIN, signing the beginning of the institutional integration of the former LAPAN to BRIN.

History
On May 31, 1962, Indonesia commenced aeronautics exploration when the Aeronautics Committee was established by the Indonesian prime minister, Djuanda, who was also the head of Indonesian Aeronautics.  The secretary of Indonesian Aeronautics, RJ Salatun, was also involved in the establishment.

On September 22, 1962, the Initial Scientific and Military Rocket Project (known in Indonesia as Proyek Roket Ilmiah dan Militer Awal or "PRIMA") was formed as an affiliation of AURI (Indonesian Air Force) and ITB (Bandung Institute of Technology).  The outcome of the project was the launching of two "Kartika I"("star") series rockets and their telemetric ordnances.

After two informal projects, which had no national contribution, the National Institute of Aeronautics and Space (LAPAN) was established in 1963 by Presidential Decree 236.

Programs
For more than 20 years, LAPAN has done research on rocket, remote sensing, satellites and space sciences.

Satellites

Palapa A1 and A2
The first program was the Palapa A1 (launched August 7, 1976) and A2 (launched October 3, 1977). The satellites were almost identical to Canada's Anik and Western Union's Westars. Although the satellites belonged to the government-owned company Perumtel, the spacecraft were made in the United States.

LAPAN satellites
The development of microsatellites has become an opportunity for LAPAN in developing its space program. The development of such satellites requires only limited budget and facilities, compared to the development of big satellites. Meanwhile, the capability to develop micro-satellite will brings LAPAN to the readiness state to implement a future space program that will have measurable economic impact, and therefore contribute to the country's sustainable development effort.

LAPAN-A1
Lapan-A1 or Lapan-Tubsat is designed to transfer of knowledge, skill and experience on micro-satellite technology development from Technische Universität Berlin, Germany to LAPAN. The spacecraft is based the German DLR-Tubsat, but includes a new star sensor and features a new 45 × 45 × 27 cm structure. The satellite payload is a commercial off-the-shelf video camera with 1000 mm lens, resulting in nadir resolution of 5 m and nadir swath of 3.5 km from 650 km altitude. In addition to that, the satellite carries another video camera with 50 mm lens, resulting in 200 m resolution video image with swath of 80 km at nadir. The uplink and downlink for telemetry, tracking and command (TTC) is done in UHF and downlink for video is done in S-band analog. The satellite was successfully launched to Sun-synchronous orbit of 635 km as auxiliary payload in Polar Satellite Launch Vehicle (PSLV) C7 from Sriharikota, India on January 10, 2007. LAPAN Tubsat performed technological experiments, earth observation and attitude control experiments.

LAPAN-A2
The mission for LAPAN-A2 or LAPAN-ORARI is Earth observation using RGB camera, maritime traffic monitoring using an automatic identification system (AIS) which can know about name and flag of the ship registered, ship type, physical and tonnage of the ship, correct and current route, departure and arrival port, and amateur radio communication (text and voice; ORARI is Indonesian Amateur Radio Organization). The satellite will be launched as a secondary payload of India's ASTROSAT mission into a circular orbit of 650 km with an inclination of 8 degrees. The purpose of the project is to develop capability to design, assembly, integration and test (AIT) process of a micro-satellite in Indonesia. The satellite was successfully launched on 28 September 2015 using India's ISRO Polar Satellite Launch Vehicle (PSLV) and will monitor Indonesia every 97 minutes or 14 times a day.

LAPAN-A3
LAPAN-A3 or LAPAN-IPB will perform experimental remote sensing mission. In addition to that, the satellite will support global AIS mission and amateur radio communication. The satellite payload is a four-band push broom multi-spectral imaging camera (Landsat band: B, G, R, NIR), which will give resolution of 18 m and coverage of 120 km from 650 km altitude. The satellite has been launched in June 2016.

International cooperation
In 2008 Indonesia signed an agreement with the Ukrainian National Space Agency (NSAU) that will allow access to rocket and satellite technologies.

Spaceport development plan

Biak Spaceport plan (2006)
Since 2006 Indonesia and Russia have been discussing the possibility of launching a satellite from Biak island using Air Launch technology. LAPAN and Russian Federal Space Agency (RKA) have worked on a government-to-government agreement in space cooperation in order to enable such activities in Indonesia. It is planned that Antonov An-124 aircraft will deliver a Polyot space launch vehicle to the new Indonesian spaceport on Biak island (West Papua province). This spaceport is well suited to commercial launches as it sits almost exactly on the equator - any space vehicle launched at the equator has a greater initial velocity imparted to it, making higher velocity or heavier payloads possible. In the spaceport, the launch vehicle will be fueled, and the satellites will be loaded on it. The Antonov An-124 carrying the launch vehicle is to fly at 10 km altitude above the ocean East of Biak island to jettison the launch vehicle  In 2012, discussions resumed. The main stumbling block is Russian concerns over compliance with the terms of the Missile Technology Control Regime; Russia is a co-signatory, Indonesia is not. In 2019, LAPAN officially confirmed plans of building Biak spaceport, with first flights expected in 2024.

Enggano Launchpad plan (2011)
In 2011, LAPAN planned to build a satellite launchpad at Enggano Island, Bengkulu province, located at the westernmost part of Indonesia at the Indian Ocean coast. There are three possible locations, two in Kioyo Natural Park and one in Gunung Nanua Bird Park. The most strategic site for this launchpad is inside Nanua Bird Park, a place called Tanjung Laboko which is 20 meters above sea level and far from residential areas. The satellite launch pad requires area only one hectare, but the safety zone requires 200 hectares. The cost to be disbursed is Rp.40 trillion (around $4.5 billion). The location is also available for assembly of the rockets and launch preparations for satellites of up to 3.8 tonnes.
The plan has concerned from the Bengkulu Natural Resources Conservation Agency because both parks are habitat for a number of bird species native to Enggano Island, which ended by rejection by Bengkulu Province government.

Morotai Spaceport plan (2012)
After studying the surrounding environment in three potential spaceport island sites (Enggano-Bengkulu, Morotai-North Maluku, and Biak-Papua), LAPAN (21/11) announced Morotai Island as a future spaceport site. Planning started in December 2012. The launch site's completion is expected in 2025. In 2013, LAPAN planned to launch an RX-550 experimental satellite launcher from a location in Morotai to be decided. This island was selected according to the following criteria:
 Morotai Island's location near the equator, which makes the launch more economical.
 The island has seven runways, one of them 2,400 meters, easily extended to 3,000 meters.
 The ease of building on Morotai, which is not densely populated, and little potential for social conflict with native inhabitants.
 Morotai Island's east side faces the Pacific Ocean directly, reducing downrange risks to other island populations.

Field installations

Ground stations

Remote-sensing satellite ground station
The Stasiun Bumi Satelit Penginderaan Jauh ("EO Satellite Ground Station") is located at Parepare, South Sulawesi. Its main functions include receiving and recording data from earth observation satellites such as Landsat, SPOT, ERS-1, JERS-1,  Terra/Aqua MODIS, and NPP operation since 1993.

Weather satellite ground stations
These ground stations, located at Pekayon, Jakarta and Biak, receive, record, and process data from NOAA, MetOp, and Himawari weather satellites 24 times a day since 1982.

LAPAN-TUBSAT was the first Indonesian surveillance micro-satellite, launched on 10 January 2007 by ISRO PSLV-C7 with Cartosat-2 developed with Technical University (TU) Berlin, where the satellite was manufactured. It circles the earth 14.5 times a day at an altitude of 630 km, in a polar orbit with an inclination of 97.60° and a period of 99.039 minutes. The longitude shift per orbit is about 24.828° with a ground track velocity of 6.744 km/s with an angular velocity of 3.635 deg/s, and a circular velocity of 7.542 km/s.

Rocket launch site 
LAPAN manages a launch site called Stasiun Peluncuran Roket (literally "Rocket Launching Station"), located at Pameungpeuk Beach in the Garut Regency on West Java. The facility was built from 1963 through cooperation between Indonesia and Japan, as the station was designed by Hideo Itokawa with the aim to support high atmospheric research using Kappa-8 rockets. This installation comprises a Motor Assembly building, a Launch Control Center, a Meteorological Sounding System building, a Rocket Motor Storage hangar and a dormitory.

Radar

Koto Tabang Equator Atmospheric Radar
The Radar Atmosfer Khatulistiwa Koto Tabang is a radar facility located at Koto Tabang, West Sumatra. It commenced operations in 2001. This facility is used for atmospheric dynamics research, especially areas concerning global climate change, such as El Niño and La Niña climate anomalies.

Laboratory

Remote Sensing Technology and Data Laboratory
The Remote Sensing Technology and Data Laboratory is located at Pekayon in Jakarta. Its functions include: data acquisition systems development, satellite payload imager systems development, satellite ground station system development, preliminary satellite imagery image processing, such as geometric correction, radiometric correction and National Remote sensing Data Bank.

Remote Sensing Applications Laboratory
The Remote Sensing Applications Laboratory at Pekayon, Jakarta, has  main function works with remote sensing satellite data applications for Land Resource, Coastal-Marine Resources, Environment Monitoring and Disaster Mitigation.

Rocket Motor Laboratory
The Laboratorium Motor Roket is located at Tarogong, West Java. It designs and produces rocket propulsion systems.

Propellant Laboratory
The 'Laboratorium Bahan Baku Propelan ("Combustion Propellant Laboratory") researches propellant, such as oxidizer Ammonium perchlorate and Hydroxyl-terminated polybutadiene.

Satellite Technology Laboratory
The Satellite Technology Laboratory is located at Bogor, West Java. Its functions include: research, development and engineering of the satellite payload, the satellite bus and facilities of the ground segment.

Aviation Technology Laboratory
The Aviation Technology Laboratory is located at Rumpin, West Java. Its functions include: research, development and engineering of aerodynamics, flight mechanics technology, propulsion technology, avionics technology and aerostructure.

Observatories
By 2020, Indonesia will join other nations in the hunt for habitable-zone exoplanets after completion of new astronomical observatory center at Kupang Regency in East Nusa Tenggara province.

Equatorial Atmosphere Observatory
The Equatorial Atmosphere Observatory of LAPAN are located at Koto Tabang, West Sumatera, has a function for research on, (1) High-resolution observations of wind vectors will make it possible to study the detailed structure of the equatorial atmosphere that is related to the growth and decay of cumulus convection; (2) From long-term continuous observations, relationships between atmospheric waves and global atmospheric circulation will be clarified; (3) By conducting observations from near the surface to the ionosphere, it will be possible to reveal dynamical couplings between the equatorial atmosphere and ionosphere. (4) Based on these results, transports of atmospheric constituents such as ozone and greenhouse gases, and the variations of the Earth's atmosphere that lead to climatic change such as El-Nino and La-Nina, will be revealed.

Solar Radiation Observatory
The 'Stasiun Pengamat Radiasi Matahari (Monitoring Stations [for] Solar Radiation) observe ultraviolet radiation of the sun. Operations began in 1992. These facilities were developed by Eko Instrument from Japan, and are located at Bandung and Pontianak.

Aerospace Observatory

For decades, Indonesian astronomy depended on the Bosscha Observatory in Lembang, West Java, which was built in 1928 by the Dutch and, at that time, had one of the largest telescopes in the southern hemisphere.

At present Aerospace Observatory of LAPAN are located at Pontianak-West Kalimantan, Pontianak-North Sulawesi, Kupang-East Nusa Tenggara and Watukosek-East Java, has a function for the observations in the field of Climatology, Atmosphere, Sun and Geomagnet.

National Observatory (Obnas)
The new observatory construction project on Mount Timau in Kupang Regency, East Nusa Tenggara, which is expected to be functioning by 2020, is set to be the biggest observatory in Southeast Asia. The observatory is built with cooperation of Bandung Institute of Technology (ITB), Nusa Cendana University (UNdana). It is designated as National Observatory (Obnas), which will have a 3.8m telescope.
The area around Obnas is developed as a National Park, with the aim of attracting tourists. The aim of the observatory is to 
build Indonesian space science up to a high degree, and 
strengthen the regions and villages, and allow for equitable distribution of inter-regional development, especially in Eastern Indonesia.

Obnas is one of LAPAN's key strategic objectives, along with mastery of rocket technology, building a launch site, growing its National Remote Sensing Data Bank (BDPJN) and National Earth Monitoring System (SPBN), and overall technological development.

Rockets
LAPAN rockets are classified "RX" (Roket Eksperimental) followed by the diameter in millimeters. For example, the RX-100 has a diameter of 100 mm.
LAPAN's current workhouse rocket propulsion system consists of four stages, namely the three-stage RX 420 and the RX-320 level. It is planned to use the RX-420 as a booster (rocket booster) RPS for the planned Roket Pengorbit Satelit ("Orbital Satellite Rocket") planned to fly in 2014.
In 2008 optimistic hopes were that this rocket, known as SLV (Satellite Launch Vehicle), would first be launched in Indonesia to 2012, and if there were extra funds pursuant to the good economic situation of 2007–8, possibly the year 2010.
In fact, the LAPAN budget for 2008 and 2007 was Rp 200 billion (approximately US$20 million). Budgetary issues surrounding the international credit crises of 2008–2009 placed many Indonesian technical projects in jeopardy most especially the complete development of RX-420 and associated micro-satellite program to world-class standards ahead of project finalization schedule and the opportunity to work together with the world institutions. LAPAN hopes to be an educating partner with Indian Aerospace in sciences related to satellite.

On November 11, 2010, LAPAN spokesman said the RX-550 rocket would undergo a static test in December 2010 and a flight test in 2012. The rocket will consist of four stages, will be part of an RPS-01 rocket to put a satellite in orbit. Before, the Polar LAPAN-TUBSAT (LAPAN-A1) satellite created in cooperation with Germany was successfully placed in orbit and until now still functioning well. The aim is to have home-made rockets and satellites.

LAPAN has re-established and rejuvenated Indonesian expertise in rocket and missile based weapons systems in cooperation with the TNI AL [Armed Forces of Indonesia] began in 2005. In April 2008, Indonesian TNI began a new missile research program alongside LAPAN. Prior to this, eight projects were sponsored by the TNI in Malacca monitoring with satellite remote LAPAN-TUBSat, most especially the theft of timber and alleged encroachment on Indonesian territorial waters in the 2009 escalation over Malaysia's claims to the huge gas fields off Ambalat-island.

RX-100
RX-100 has:
diameter of 110 mm
length of 1900 mm
mass of 30 kg and length of 1900 mm.
Functions: to test rocket payload subsystems.
Propellant type: solid-composite
Fuel time: 2.5 seconds,
Flight time: 70 seconds
Maximum speed: Mach 1.
Range: 11 km, 7000 m altitude,
Payload: Diagnostic,: GPS, altitude meter, gyro, 3-axis accelerometer, CPU processor and battery.

RX-150 / 120
Two-stage rocket launching RX-150-120 supported by TNI-AD (Indonesian Army) and PT Pindad.
Rocket with cruise distance 24 km was successfully launched from a moving vehicle (Pindad Panser) on March 31, 2009.

R-Han 122
The R-Han 122 rocket has is a land-to-land weapon with a shooting range up to 15 kilometers at Mach 1.8. On March 28, 2012, fifty R-Han 122 have been successfully launched. The rocket are the result of the six years LAPAN's work. By 2014, at least 500 R-Han 122 rockets will be part of army arsenal.

RX-250
The main rocket, the Lapan RX-250 were launched regularly between 1987 and 2005.

RX-320
In 2008 Lapan successfully flew two RX-320. These 320 mm diameter rockets were launched on 2 July and 30 May 2008 at Pameungpeuk, West Java.

Space launchers

RPS-420 (Pengorbitan-1)
Category: micro-satellites orbital launch vehicle, similar to Lambda from Japan, but with lighter modern materials and modern avionics. Launch unguided at a 70-degree angle of inclination with a four-stage solid rocket motor launcher.

Diameter: 420 mm
Length: 6200 mm
Lift-off mass: 1000 kg.
Propellant: solid composite, firing time 13 seconds
Thrust: 9.6 tons
Flight duration: 205 seconds
Maximum velocity: mach 4.5
Range: 101 km, 53000 m altitude
Payload: diagnostic, GPS, altimeter, gyro, 3-axis accelerometer, processor and battery.
The RX-420 was entirely built using local materials.

LAPAN carried out a stationary test on RX-420 on 23 December 2008 in Tarogong, West Java. The RX-420 missile was tested at the launching station Cilauteureun, Pameungpeuk District, Garut regency, West Java.
The LAPAN RX-420 is the test bed for the entirely indigenously developed satellite launch vehicle. RX-420 is suitable for launch of micro-satellites (50 kg or less) and nano-satellites (5 kg or less) in co-development with Technical University of Berlin

The rocket launching plan will be extended in 2010 by launching combined RX-420-420 and in 2011 for combined RX-420-420 – 320 and SOB 420.

RPS-420/520 (Pengorbitan-2)
At planning stage are the RX-420 with multiple customizable configuration boosters and the planned 520mm RX-520. The RX-520 is predicted to be able to launch 100 kg+ payload into orbit. This large rocket is intended to be fueled by high-pressure liquid. Hydrogen Peroxide and various hydrocarbons are under evaluation. Addition of RX-420 boosters to the RX-520 is calculated to increase lifting capacity to 500 kg+ payload, although if too expensive, the proven Russian Soyuz and Energiya will likely be employed.

RX-520 consists of one RX-420 and two boosters of RX-420 in stage-1, one RX-420 in stage-2, one RX-420 in stage-3 and as a payload launcher one RX-320 in stage-4.

RX-550
In 2013, LAPAN intends to launch an RX-550 experimental satellite launcher from some point in Morotai to be decided.

LAPAN Library
In June 2009, LAPAN launched its extensive online library of over 8000 titles on aeronautics and astronautics. This is the largest dedicated aerospace library in ASEAN and it is hoped to bring Indonesian and ASEAN talent into the LAPAN program, especially for those disadvantaged by location. It is unclear how much content will be available freely to the public, and what specific form of library will operate.

Komurindo
Komurindo or Kompetisi Muatan Roket Indonesia means Indonesia Payload Rocket Competition. The competition is established by LAPAN, Education Ministry and some universities, etc. to enhance rocket research in the universities. The third competition was held in late June 2011 in Pandansimo Beach of Bantul, Yogyakarta.

Aircraft
 LAPAN XT-400
 LSU-02
 LSU-03
 LAPAN FIGHTER EXPERIMENT

Logo

End of LAPAN 
On 1 September 2021, LAPAN finally dissolved and transformed into Space and Aeronautics Research Organization of BRIN, signing the beginning of the institutional integration of the former LAPAN to BRIN.

See also
 List of government space agencies
 List of rocket launch sites
 Pratiwi Sudarmono

References

External links

 
 LAPAN remote Sensing
 https://web.archive.org/web/20090815080000/http://www.lapan.go.id/lombaRUM2009/index.php
 LAPAN Satellite Technology
 State Ministry of Research and Technology, Indonesia (RISTEK)

Government agencies of Indonesia
Space agencies
Science and technology in Indonesia
Space program of Indonesia
Aerospace
Defense companies of Indonesia
1963 establishments in Indonesia
2021 disestablishments in Indonesia